

Countess of Löwenstein (1494–1611)

Countess of Löwenstein-Scharfeneck (1552?–1633)

Countess of Löwenstein-Wertheim (1580-1665)

Countess of Löwenstein-Wertheim-Virneburg (1611–1812)

Countess of Löwenstein-Wertheim-Rochefort (1611–1712)

Princess of Löwenstein-Wertheim

Löwenstein-Wertheim-Freudenberg (1812–present)

Löwenstein-Wertheim-Rochefort (1712–1803)

Löwenstein-Wertheim-Rosenberg (1803–present)

Sources

 
Löwenstein-Wertheim
Löwenstein-Wertheim